Events in the year 2021 in Finland.

Incumbents
President: Sauli Niinistö
Prime Minister: Sanna Marin
Eduskunta/Riksdag: 2019-2023 Eduskunta/Riksdag
Speaker of the Eduskunta/Riksdag: Anu Vehviläinen

Events
Ongoing — COVID-19 pandemic in Finland
 July 6, 2021 - Lapland recorded its highest temperature in over a century.

Deaths

January 

13 January
 Pave Maijanen, rock musician (b. 1950)
 Sinikka Nopola, writer and journalist (b. 1953)
14 January – Yrjö Rantanen, 70, Finnish chess grandmaster.
16 January – Pave Maijanen, 70, Finnish musician (Hurriganes, Dingo), complications from amyotrophic lateral sclerosis.
22 January
, radio and television presenter (b. 1932)
 Raimo Suikkanen, 78, Finnish Olympic racing cyclist (1968, 1972).
27 January – Tiina Rinne, actress (b. 1929)

February

12 February – Paavo Pystynen, 89, Finnish Olympic long-distance runner (1964).
14 February – Finn Knutsen, 88, Norwegian politician, MP (1985–1989).
16 February – , studio musician (b. 1934)
17 February – Jyrki Yrttiaho, 68, Finnish politician, MP (2007–2015).

March

5 March – Aulis Sipponen, 92, Finnish Olympic skier (1952).
8 March – Risto Aaltonen, 81, Finnish actor (Leikkikalugangsteri, Crime and Punishment, Uuno Turhapuro muuttaa maalle).
13 March – , jazz musician (b. 1936)
17 March – Kristian Gullichsen, 88, Finnish architect.

References

 
2020s in Finland
Years of the 21st century in Finland
Finland
Finland